Corissa Vella White (née Vella; born 19 March 1988), known as Corissa Vella, is a Maltese footballer who plays as a midfielder. She has officially played for the senior Malta women's national team.

International career
Vella capped for Malta at senior level during the 2011 FIFA Women's World Cup qualification – UEFA Group 5 and the UEFA Women's Euro 2013 qualifying (preliminary round).

References

1988 births
Living people
Women's association football midfielders
Maltese women's footballers
Malta women's international footballers
Hibernians F.C. players